Leave a Whisper is the debut studio album by American rock band Shinedown. The album was released on May 27, 2003, faring well due to the success of the singles "Fly from the Inside" and "45". Recording took place at Henson Recording Studios and The Blue Room, both in Los Angeles. Leave a Whisper paved the way for Shinedown's successful second album, Us and Them, and was re-released on June 15, 2004, to incorporate a cover version of Lynyrd Skynyrd's "Simple Man". The album's singles also fared well, with "Fly from the Inside" reaching No. 5, "45" reaching No. 3, "Simple Man" reaching No. 5, and "Burning Bright" reaching No. 2 on the US Mainstream Rock list.

Leave a Whisper is Shinedown's second best-selling album. On August 17, 2004, it was certified gold for 500,000 copies sold, and by October 21, 2005, the album had sold one million copies in the US, and was certified platinum by the RIAA.

Background
Prior to the album's release, frontman Brent Smith had been working with his prior band, "Dreve", which had signed a record deal with Atlantic Records in 2000. The record label, unhappy with Dreve as a whole, dropped the band prior to releasing an album, but retained Smith, who they felt was worth developing separately as an artist. Atlantic signed Smith to a development deal where record representatives helped him with his song-writing ability, and helped him recruit members for a new band, which would become Shinedown. Smith moved to Jacksonville, Florida and began work on the project in 2001. The first member he recruited was bassist Brad Stewart, through local Jacksonville music producer Pete Thornton. Smith and Stewart began recording demos together in a small local studio, whose owner recommended they meet with her fiancé, guitarist Jasin Todd, who Smith brought in as the third member. The original lineup was rounded out by drummer Barry Kerch, who was the seventh drummer the band had auditioned for the spot. The four worked together on creating demos, and submitted their work-in-progress material to Atlantic, who approved of the material and greenlit a full-length album.

Release and promotion
The album was released May 27, 2003. While not an immediate success, through the extensive touring and successful singles, eventually went platinum in the United States, indicating sales of over 1 million. Four singles were released from the album "Fly from the Inside", "45", and a cover of the Lynyrd Skynyrd song, "Simple Man", and "Burning Bright". All four singles charted in the top five of the Billboard Mainstream Rock charts, peaking at fifth, third, fifth, and second, respectively. The band toured extensively in support of the album, playing over 400 live shows over the course of 2003 and 2004. The band ended up touring for 24 months straight, doing various tours with Van Halen, Seether, and Three Doors Down. The band later released a live DVD titled Live from the Inside that documented the live shows of the touring cycle.

The album was re-released twice. The final three tracks only appear on the enhanced edition, released June 15, 2004. This re-release was prompted due to the popularity of their "Simple Man" cover, which was not present on the original album's release. On July 7, 2009 Shinedown digitally released a deluxe edition of Leave a Whisper, featuring demo material and unused tracks from the recording sessions.

Reception

AllMusic compared Leave a Whisper to that of post-grunge acts like Creed, Puddle of Mudd, and a modern-day Alice in Chains. They go on to state "Coupled with a plodding, two-dimensional sound varying little from song to song, let alone from the sound of its peers, Shinedown's debut offers scant hope that heavy music will right itself from the nasty stumble of its last few years." According to Melodic, the album will satisfy fans of bands like Depswa and Saliva.

Track listing

Personnel 
Band
 Brent Smith – lead vocals
 Jasin Todd – guitars, lap steel, theremin, sitar
 Brad Stewart – bass
 Barry Kerch – drums, percussion

Additional personnel
 Bob Marlette – producer, engineer (tracks 1, 2, 4-6, 10, 11)
 Tony Battaglia – engineer, mixing, producer (tracks 12-15)
 Rick Beato – engineer, producer (tracks 3, 7-9)
Andy Wallace – mixing (tracks 1, 2, 4-6, 10, 11)
Randy Staub – mixing (tracks 3, 7-9)
 Steven Marshall – additional guitar on "45"

Charts

Weekly charts

Year-end charts

Certifications

References

2003 debut albums
Albums produced by Bob Marlette
Atlantic Records albums
Shinedown albums